Francisco Moreno-Fernández (born Mota del Cuervo, Spain, 1960) is a Spanish dialectologist and sociolinguist.

Career
Moreno-Fernández holds a PhD in Hispanic Linguistics, is Professor of Spanish Language at the University of Alcalá (Spain) and Alexander von Humboldt professor at Heidelberg University. Since acceptance of this professorship awarded by the Alexander von Humboldt Foundation and endowed by the Federal Ministry of Education and Research he is directing the Heidelberg Center for Ibero-American Studies (HCIAS). He pursues research in sociolinguistics, dialectology, and applied linguistics. He has been Academic Director of the "Instituto Cervantes" (2008-2013) and a visiting researcher at the universities of London, New York, (SUNY – Albany), Québec (Montreal), and Tokyo as well as visiting professor at Göteborg University (Sweden), Universidade de Sao Paulo (Brazil), University of Illinois at Chicago, Brigham Young University, and Pontificia Universidad Católica de Chile.

He is Full Member of the  North American Academy of the Spanish Language (since 2017), and Corresponding Member of the Cuban Academy of the Language (since 2013), the Spanish Royal Academy (since 2015), the Chilean Academy of the Language (since 2017), and the Mexican Academy of Language (since 2018).

Moreno-Fernández was Director of the Cervantes institutes at São Paulo (1998–2001) and Chicago (2001–2005). He was Academic and Research Director of the Comillas Foundation for the study and teaching of Spanish Language and Culture (2006–2008) and Director of the Instituto Cervantes at Harvard University (Observatory of the Spanish Language and Hispanic Cultures in the United States) (2013-2018).

In 1998, he coordinated the first Cervantes Institute Yearbook. Spanish in the World. He has been a columnist in several American journals in Spanish: La Opinión (Los Angeles), El Diario La Prensa (New York), and La Raza (Chicago) and co-editor of the journals Spanish in Context (John Benjamins) and Journal of Linguistic Geography (Cambridge University Press). He was founder and first general editor of the journal Lengua y migración / Language & Migration. He belongs to the Editorial Board of the journals: International Journal of the Sociology of Language, Journal of World Languages, Boletín de Filología de la Universidad de Chile, Lingüística Española Actual, Revista Internacional de Lingüística Iberoamericana, and Oralia.

Publications
 "Yo-Yo Boing! Or Literature as a Translingual Practice" in Poets, Philosophers: On the Writings of Giannina Braschi. Frederick Luis Aldama, ed. Pittsburgh, University of Pittsburgh Press. (2020) .
El español lengua migratoria, Vol. Monográfico Archiletras Científica, II (2020). .
 Gramática fundamental del español (2020) (with Inmaculada Penadés Martínez and Clara Ureña Tormo). London, Routledge.  .
 Variedades de la lengua española (2020). London, Routledge.  .
 Tras Babel. De la naturaleza social del lenguaje (2018). Oviedo: Ediciones Nobel. .
 Diccionario de anglicismos del español estadounidense (2018). Cambridge, MA: Instituto Cervantes at Harvard. .
 A Framework for Cognitive Sociolinguistics (2016). London: Routledge. .
 La maravillosa historia del español (2015). Madrid: Espasa. .
 Spanish Revolution. Ensayo sobre los lenguajes indignados (2014). Valencia: Unoycero. .
 Las lenguas de España a debate (2013) (with. F. Ramallo). Valencia: Unoycero. .
Sociolingüística cognitiva (2012). Madrid /Frankfurt: Iberoamericana / Vervuert.  (Iberoamericana) / 978-3-86527-742-8 (Vervuert).
Las variedades de la lengua española y su enseñanza (2010). Madrid: Arco/Libros. .
La lengua española en su geografía. Manual de dialectología hispánica (2009; updated 2nd. ed., 2014). Madrid: Arco/Libros. .
Atlas de la lengua española en el mundo (2008) (with J. Otero). Barcelona: Ariel. . (3rd. ed. updated, 2017. ). 
(ed.) Sociolinguistics of Spanish in Spain: the bilingual areas (2007). International Journal of the Sociology of Language. ISSN (Online): 1613-3668. ISSN (Print) 0165-2516.
Demografía de la lengua española (2007) (with J. Otero). Madrid: Fundación Telefónica - Instituto Complutense de Estudios Internacionales. .
Principios de Sociolingüística y Sociología del Lenguaje. (1998; 2nd.ed, 2005; 3rd ed., 2008). Barcelona: Ariel. .
Historia social de las lenguas de España (2005). Barcelona: Ariel. 
La lengua hablada en Alcalá de Henares (2004–2007) (with A. Cestero, I. Molina and F. Paredes). Alcalá de Henares: Universidad de Alcalá. 
Diccionario bilingüe de uso Español – Portugués / Portugués- Español (2003; 2nd.ed,2005). Madrid: Arco/Libros. .
Producción, expresión e interacción oral (2002). Madrid: Arco/Libros. .
Qué español enseñar (2000; 2nd.ed, 2007). Madrid: Arco/Libros. .
(dir.) Diccionario para la Enseñanza de la Lengua Española (1995). Barcelona: Biblograf. .
La división dialectal del español de América (1993). Alcalá de Henares: Universidad de Alcalá. .
(ed.) Sociolinguistics and Stylistic Variation (1992). Lynx. .
Metodología sociolingüística (1990). Madrid: Gredos. .

Awards and distinctions
 Voto de Louvor da Universidade Federal do Rio de Janeiro (2000)
 "National Association of Hispanic Publications". First Place. Multiple Article Series, Larger Publications (Las Vegas, USA; March 2003)
 XV "Juan Martín de Nicolás" Research Award (2006)
 National Essay Prize Finalist. Spain (2016)
 Honorary Doctor Universidad Ricardo Palma (Peru) (2017)
 "Rey de España" Award of Journalism XV Premio Don Quijote (Spain) (2018)
 Instituto Cervantes Medal (2019)
 International Award Winner - Alexander von Humboldt Foundation (2020)
 Gold Insignia - Universidad de Alcalá (2022)

External links

 Francisco Moreno Fernández personal website
 Francisco Moreno Fernández at Dialnet
Francisco Moreno Fernández at Instituto Cervantes
 Francisco Moreno Fernández at Google Academics
 Francisco Moreno Fernández at Alexander von Humboldt Foundation

Spanish educators

Dialectologists
Sociolinguists

University of Alcalá
Living people
1960 births